Players and pairs who neither have high enough rankings nor receive wild cards may participate in a qualifying tournament held one week before the annual Wimbledon Tennis Championships.

Seeds

  Nuria Llagostera Vives (second round)
  Chan Yung-jan (first round)
  Arantxa Rus (second round)
  Irina Falconi (qualified)
  Tamarine Tanasugarn (qualified)
  Edina Gallovits-Hall (second round)
  Maria Elena Camerin (second round)
  Carla Suárez Navarro (second round)
  Eva Birnerová (second round)
  Iryna Brémond (first round)
  Renata Voráčová (first round)
  Sloane Stephens (second round)
  Junri Namigata (qualifying competition)
  Stéphanie Foretz Gacon (qualifying competition, lucky loser)
  Lesia Tsurenko (qualified)
  Yvonne Meusburger (second round)
  Misaki Doi (qualified)
  Kurumi Nara (second round)
  Chang Kai-chen (qualified)
  Sílvia Soler Espinosa (qualifying competition, retired)
  Urszula Radwańska (first round)
  Mandy Minella (first round)
  Stéphanie Dubois (qualifying competition, lucky loser)
  Valeria Savinykh (second round)

Qualifiers

  Chang Kai-chen
  Marina Erakovic
  Camila Giorgi
  Irina Falconi
  Tamarine Tanasugarn
  Lesia Tsurenko
  Vitalia Diatchenko
  Misaki Doi
  Kristýna Plíšková
  Mona Barthel
  Alexa Glatch
  Aleksandra Wozniak

Lucky losers

  Stéphanie Foretz Gacon
  Stéphanie Dubois

Qualifying draw

First qualifier

Second qualifier

Third qualifier

Fourth qualifier

Fifth qualifier

Sixth qualifier

Seventh qualifier

Eighth qualifier

Ninth qualifier

Tenth qualifier

Eleventh qualifier

Twelfth qualifier

External links

2011 Wimbledon Championships on WTAtennis.com
2011 Wimbledon Championships – Women's draws and results at the International Tennis Federation

Women's Singles Qualifying
Wimbledon Championship by year – Women's singles qualifying
Wimbledon Championships